The 1989–90 I-Divisioona season was the 16th season of the I-Divisioona, the second level of Finnish ice hockey. 12 teams participated in the league, and Ässät Pori won the championship. Ässät Pori and Hockey-Reipas Lahti qualified for the promotion/relegation round of the SM-liiga.

Regular season

External links
 Season on hockeyarchives.info

2
Fin
I-Divisioona seasons